Procapperia hackeri is a moth of the family Pterophoridae. It is known from Yemen.

References

Oxyptilini
Moths of the Arabian Peninsula
Moths described in 2002